
Nidzica County is a unit of territorial administration and local government (powiat) in Warmian-Masurian Voivodeship, northern Poland. It came into being on January 1, 1999, as a result of the Polish local government reforms passed in 1998.

As of 2006 its total population is 33,955, out of which the population of Nidzica is 14,761 and the rural population is 19,194.

Population
The county's population has stagnated and remained the same for the past four decades, never surpassing the 35300 mark.

Historical population 
In 1825 Nidzica County (Kreis Neidenburg) had 29617 inhabitants, including by mother tongue: 27467 (~93%) Polish and 2149 (~7%) German.

Neighbouring counties
Nidzica County is bordered by Olsztyn County to the north, Szczytno County to the east, Przasnysz County to the south-east, Mława County to the south, Działdowo County to the south-west and Ostróda County to the north-west.

Administrative division
The county is subdivided into four gminas (one urban-rural and three rural). These are listed in the following table, in descending order of population.

See also
List of counties in Poland

References

Polish official population figures 2006

 
Nidzica